Eleothinus pygmaeus is a species of longhorn beetles of the subfamily Lamiinae. It was described by Henry Walter Bates in 1885, and is known from Honduras, and from Guatemala to Panama.

References

Beetles described in 1885
Acanthocinini